Microthelys is a genus of flowering plants from the orchid family, Orchidaceae. Its species are native to Mexico, Central America and Ecuador.

Microthelys constricta (Szlach.) Szlach. - central Mexico
Microthelys hintoniorum (Todzia) Szlach., Rutk. & Mytnik - Nuevo León
Microthelys intagana (Dodson & Dressler) Szlach. - Ecuador 
Microthelys markowskiana (Szlach.) Szlach. - Oaxaca
Microthelys minutiflora (A.Rich. & Galeotti) Garay - from San Luis Potosí south to Guatemala
Microthelys nutantiflora (Schltr.) Garay - Guatemala, Costa Rica
Microthelys rubrocallosa (B.L.Rob. & Greenm.) Garay - from central Mexico south to Guatemala

See also 
 List of Orchidaceae genera

References 

  (1980) Botanical Museum Leaflets 28 (4): 336. 
  (2003) Genera Orchidacearum 3: 227 ff. Oxford University Press.
  2005. Handbuch der Orchideen-Namen. Dictionary of Orchid Names. Dizionario dei nomi delle orchidee. Ulmer, Stuttgart

External links 

Cranichideae genera
Spiranthinae